WXRK-LP is an active rock and alternative rock formatted broadcast radio station licensed to Charlottesville, Virginia, serving Charlottesville and Albemarle County in Virginia.  WXRK-LP is owned and operated by Blue Ridge Free Media.

References

External links
 Rock Hits 92-3 Online
 

2015 establishments in Virginia
Active rock radio stations in the United States
Alternative rock radio stations in the United States
Radio stations established in 2015
XRK-LP
XRK-LP
Mass media in Charlottesville, Virginia